In organic chemistry, a ketone  is a functional group with the structure , where R and R' can be a variety of carbon-containing substituents. Ketones contain a carbonyl group  (which contains a carbon-oxygen double bond C=O). The simplest ketone is acetone (where R and R' is methyl), with the formula . Many ketones are of great importance in biology and in industry. Examples include many sugars (ketoses), many steroids (e.g., testosterone), and the solvent acetone.

Nomenclature and etymology
The word ketone is derived from Aketon, an old German word for acetone.

According to the rules of IUPAC nomenclature, ketone names are derived by changing the suffix -ane of the parent alkane to -anone. Typically, the position of the carbonyl group is denoted by a number, but traditional nonsystematic names are still generally used for the most important ketones, for example acetone and benzophenone. These nonsystematic names are considered retained IUPAC names, although some introductory chemistry textbooks use systematic names such as "2-propanone" or "propan-2-one" for the simplest ketone instead of "acetone".

The derived names of ketones are obtained by writing separately the names of the two alkyl groups attached to the carbonyl group, followed by "ketone" as a separate word. Traditionally the names of the alkyl groups were written in order of increasing complexity, for example  methyl ethyl ketone. However, according to the rules of IUPAC nomenclature, the alkyl groups are written alphabetically, for example  ethyl methyl ketone. When the two alkyl groups are the same, the prefix "di-" is added before the name of alkyl group. The positions of other groups are indicated by Greek letters, the α-carbon being the atom adjacent to carbonyl group.

Although used infrequently, oxo is the IUPAC nomenclature for the oxo group (=O) and used as prefix when the ketone does not have the highest priority. Other prefixes, however, are also used. For some common chemicals (mainly in biochemistry), keto refer to the ketone functional group.

Structure and properties

The ketone carbon is often described as sp2 hybridized, a description that includes both their electronic and molecular structure. Ketones are trigonal planar around the ketonic carbon, with C–C–O and C–C–C bond angles of approximately 120°. Ketones differ from aldehydes in that the carbonyl group (C=O) is bonded to two carbons within a carbon skeleton. In aldehydes, the carbonyl is bonded to one carbon and one hydrogen and are located at the ends of carbon chains. Ketones are also distinct from other carbonyl-containing functional groups, such as carboxylic acids, esters and amides.

The carbonyl group is polar because the electronegativity of the oxygen is greater than that for carbon. Thus, ketones are nucleophilic at oxygen and electrophilic at carbon. Because the carbonyl group interacts with water by hydrogen bonding, ketones are typically more soluble in water than the related methylene compounds. Ketones are hydrogen-bond acceptors. Ketones are not usually hydrogen-bond donors and cannot hydrogen-bond to themselves. Because of their inability to serve both as hydrogen-bond donors and acceptors, ketones tend not to "self-associate" and are more volatile than alcohols and carboxylic acids of comparable molecular weights. These factors relate to the pervasiveness of ketones in perfumery and as solvents.

Classes of ketones
Ketones are classified on the basis of their substituents. One broad classification subdivides ketones into symmetrical and unsymmetrical derivatives, depending on the equivalency of the two organic substituents attached to the carbonyl center. Acetone and benzophenone are symmetrical ketones. Acetophenone  is an unsymmetrical ketone.

Diketones

Many kinds of diketones are known, some with unusual properties. The simplest is diacetyl , once used as butter-flavoring in popcorn. Acetylacetone (pentane-2,4-dione) is virtually a misnomer (inappropriate name) because this species exists mainly as the monoenol . Its enolate is a common ligand in coordination chemistry.

Unsaturated ketones
Ketones containing alkene and alkyne units are often called unsaturated ketones. The most widely used member of this class of compounds is methyl vinyl ketone, which is useful in the Robinson annulation reaction. Lest there be confusion, a ketone itself is a site of unsaturation; that is, it can be hydrogenated.

Cyclic ketones
Many ketones are cyclic. The simplest class have the formula , where n varies from 2 for cyclopropanone to the tens. Larger derivatives exist. Cyclohexanone, a symmetrical cyclic ketone, is an important intermediate in the production of nylon. Isophorone, derived from acetone, is an unsaturated, asymmetrical ketone that is the precursor to other polymers. Muscone, 3-methylpentadecanone, is an animal pheromone. Another cyclic ketone is cyclobutanone, having the formula .

Keto-enol tautomerization

Ketones that have at least one alpha-hydrogen, undergo keto-enol tautomerization; the tautomer is an enol. Tautomerization is catalyzed by both acids and bases. Usually, the keto form is more stable than the enol. This equilibrium allows ketones to be prepared via the hydration of alkynes.

Acid/base properties of ketones
 bonds adjacent to the carbonyl in ketones are more acidic pKa ≈ 20) than the  bonds in alkane (pKa ≈ 50). This difference reflects resonance stabilization of the enolate ion that is formed upon deprotonation. The relative acidity of the α-hydrogen is important in the enolization reactions of ketones and other carbonyl compounds. The acidity of the α-hydrogen also allows ketones and other carbonyl compounds to react as nucleophiles at that position, with either stoichiometric and catalytic base.

Ketones are also weak bases, undergoing protonation on the carbonyl oxygen in the presence of Brønsted acids. Ketonium ions (i.e., protonated ketones) are strong acids, with pKa values estimated to be somewhere between –5 and –7. Although acids encountered in organic chemistry are seldom strong enough to fully protonate ketones, the formation of equilibrium concentrations of protonated ketones is nevertheless an important step in the mechanisms of many common organic reactions, like the formation of an acetal, for example. Acids as weak as pyridinium cation (as found in pyridinium tosylate) with a pKa of 5.2 are able to serve as catalysts in this context, despite the highly unfavorable equilibrium constant for protonation (Keq < 10−10).

Characterization
An aldehyde differs from a ketone in that it has a hydrogen atom attached to its carbonyl group, making aldehydes easier to oxidize. Ketones do not have a hydrogen atom bonded to the carbonyl group, and are therefore more resistant to oxidation. They are oxidized only by powerful oxidizing agents which have the ability to cleave carbon–carbon bonds.

Spectroscopy
Ketones and aldehydes absorb strongly in the infra-red spectrum near 1700 cm−1. The exact position of the peak depends on the substituents.

Whereas 1H NMR spectroscopy is generally not useful for establishing the presence of a ketone, 13C NMR spectra exhibit signals somewhat downfield of 200 ppm depending on structure. Such signals are typically weak due to the absence of nuclear Overhauser effects. Since aldehydes resonate at similar chemical shifts, multiple resonance experiments are employed to definitively distinguish aldehydes and ketones.

Qualitative organic tests
Ketones give positive results in Brady's test, the reaction with 2,4-dinitrophenylhydrazine to give the corresponding hydrazone. Ketones may be distinguished from aldehydes by giving a negative result with Tollens' reagent or with Fehling's solution. Methyl ketones give positive results for the iodoform test. Ketones also give positive results when treated with m-dinitrobenzene in presence of dilute sodium hydroxide to give violet coloration.

Synthesis
Many methods exist for the preparation of ketones in industrial scale and academic laboratories. Ketones are also produced in various ways by organisms; see the section on biochemistry below.

In industry, the most important method probably involves oxidation of hydrocarbons, often with air. For example, a billion kilograms of cyclohexanone are produced annually by aerobic oxidation of cyclohexane. Acetone is prepared by air-oxidation of cumene.

For specialized or small scale organic synthetic applications, ketones are often prepared by oxidation of secondary alcohols:

Typical strong oxidants (source of "O" in the above reaction) include potassium permanganate or a Cr(VI) compound. Milder conditions make use of the Dess–Martin periodinane or the Moffatt–Swern methods.

Many other methods have been developed, examples include:
 By geminal halide hydrolysis.
 By hydration of alkynes. Such processes occur via enols and require the presence of an acid and mercury(II) sulfate. Subsequent enol–keto tautomerization gives a ketone. This reaction always produces a ketone, even with a terminal alkyne, the only exception being the hydration of acetylene, which produces acetaldehyde.
From Weinreb Amides using stoichiometric organometallic reagents.
 Aromatic ketones can be prepared in the Friedel–Crafts acylation, the related Houben–Hoesch reaction, and the Fries rearrangement.
 Ozonolysis, and related dihydroxylation/oxidative sequences, cleave alkenes to give aldehydes or ketones, depending on alkene substitution pattern.
 In the Kornblum–DeLaMare rearrangement ketones are prepared from peroxides and base.
 In the Ruzicka cyclization, cyclic ketones are prepared from dicarboxylic acids.
 In the Nef reaction, ketones form by hydrolysis of salts of secondary nitro compounds.
 In the Fukuyama coupling, ketones form from a thioester and an organozinc compound.
 By the reaction of an acid chloride with organocadmium compounds or organocopper compounds.
 The Dakin–West reaction provides an efficient method for preparation of certain methyl ketones from carboxylic acids.
 Ketones can also be prepared by the reaction of Grignard reagents with nitriles, followed by hydrolysis.
 By decarboxylation of carboxylic anhydride.
 Ketones can be prepared from haloketones in reductive dehalogenation of halo ketones.
 In ketonic decarboxylation symmetrical ketones are prepared from carboxylic acids.
 Oxidation of amines with iron(III) chloride.
 Hydrolysis of unsaturated secondary amides, β-Keto acid esters, or β-diketones.
 Acid-catalysed rearrangement of 1,2-diols.

Reactions

Ketones engage in many organic reactions. The most important reactions follow from the susceptibility of the carbonyl carbon toward nucleophilic addition and the tendency for the enolates to add to electrophiles.
Nucleophilic additions include in approximate order of their generality:
 With water (hydration) gives geminal diols, which are usually not formed in appreciable (or observable) amounts
 With an acetylide to give the α-hydroxyalkyne
 With ammonia or a primary amine gives an imine
 With secondary amine gives an enamine
 With Grignard and organolithium reagents to give, after aqueous workup, a tertiary alcohol
 With an alcohols or alkoxides to gives the hemiketal or its conjugate base. With a diol to the ketal. This reaction is employed to protect ketones.
 With sodium amide resulting in C–C bond cleavage with formation of the amide RCONH2 and the alkane or arene R'H, a reaction called the Haller–Bauer reaction.

 With strong oxidizing agents to give carboxylic acids. Ketones are generally oxidized under vigorous conditions, i.e., strong oxidizing agents and at elevated temperatures. Their oxidation involves carbon-carbon bond cleavage to afford a mixture of carboxylic acids having lesser number of carbon atoms than the parent ketone. 

 Electrophilic addition, reaction with an electrophile gives a resonance stabilized cation
 With phosphonium ylides in the Wittig reaction to give the alkenes
 With thiols to give the thioacetal
 With hydrazine or 1-disubstituted derivatives of hydrazine to give hydrazones.
 With a metal hydride gives a metal alkoxide salt, hydrolysis of which gives the alcohol, an example of ketone reduction
 With halogens to form an α-haloketone, a reaction that proceeds via an enol (see Haloform reaction)
 With heavy water to give an α-deuterated ketone
 Fragmentation in photochemical Norrish reaction
 Reaction of 1,4-aminodiketones to oxazoles by dehydration in the Robinson–Gabriel synthesis
 In the case of aryl–alkyl ketones, with sulfur and an amine give amides in the Willgerodt reaction
 With hydroxylamine to produce oximes
 With reducing agents to form secondary alcohols
 With peroxy acids to form esters in the Baeyer–Villiger oxidation

Biochemistry

Ketones are pervasive in nature. The formation of organic compounds in photosynthesis occurs via the ketone ribulose-1,5-bisphosphate. Many sugars are ketones, known collectively as ketoses. The best known ketose is fructose; it mostly exists as a cyclic hemiketal, which masks the ketone functional group. Fatty acid synthesis proceeds via ketones. Acetoacetate is an intermediate in the Krebs cycle which releases energy from sugars and carbohydrates.

In medicine, acetone, acetoacetate, and beta-hydroxybutyrate are collectively called ketone bodies, generated from carbohydrates, fatty acids, and amino acids in most vertebrates, including humans. Ketone bodies are elevated in the blood (ketosis) after fasting, including a night of sleep; in both blood and urine in starvation; in hypoglycemia, due to causes other than hyperinsulinism; in various inborn errors of metabolism, and intentionally induced via a ketogenic diet, and in ketoacidosis (usually due to diabetes mellitus). Although ketoacidosis is characteristic of decompensated or untreated type 1 diabetes, ketosis or even ketoacidosis can occur in type 2 diabetes in some circumstances as well.

Applications
Ketones are produced on massive scales in industry as solvents, polymer precursors, and pharmaceuticals. In terms of scale, the most important ketones are acetone, methylethyl ketone, and cyclohexanone. They are also common in biochemistry, but less so than in organic chemistry in general. The combustion of hydrocarbons is an uncontrolled oxidation process that gives ketones as well as many other types of compounds.

Toxicity
Although it is difficult to generalize on the toxicity of such a broad class of compounds, simple ketones are, in general, not highly toxic. This characteristic is one reason for their popularity as solvents.

See also
Diketone
Ketone bodies
Thioketone
Triketone
Ynone
Ketosis

References

External links

Functional groups